Eiríksjökull (Icelandic for "Eirík's glacier") is a glacier north-west of Langjökull in Iceland, with an area of  reaching a height of , making it the largest table mountain in Iceland. It is currently dormant or extinct in terms of volcanic activity.

Etymology
The glacier was called Baldjökull until about 1700 and with relative certainty the current name is influenced by the nearby mountain Eiríksgnípa. Nothing is known with certainty about said Erik but a fable tells of an outlaw named Eiríkur or Eirekur who evaded capture by running into that mountain.

References

Glaciers of Iceland
Borgarbyggð